NGC 4252 is a spiral galaxy approximately 56 million light-years away from Earth in the constellation of Virgo. It belongs to the Virgo cluster of galaxies.

It was discovered by German astronomer Albert Marth on May 26, 1864.

See also 
 List of NGC objects (4001–5000)

References

External links 
 
 
 SEDS

Spiral galaxies
Virgo (constellation)
4252
39537
Astronomical objects discovered in 1864
Discoveries by Albert Marth
Virgo Cluster